Ciaffone is a surname. Notable people with the surname include:

Bob Ciaffone (1940–2022), American author and poker player
Larry Ciaffone (1924–1991), American baseball player